Pipizella is a genus Hoverflies, from the family Syrphidae, in the order Diptera.

Species
P. altaica Violovitsh, 1981
P. annulata Macquart, 1829
P. antennata Violovitsh, 1981
P. barkalovi Violovitsh, 1981
P. bayburtica Claussen & Hayat, 1997
P. beckeri Bradescu, 1986
P. bispina Simic, 1987
P. brevis Lucas, 1977
P. calabra (Goeldlin, 1974)
P. cantabrica Claussen, 1991
P. caucasica Skufjin, 1976
P. certa Violovitsh, 1981
P. cornuta Kuznetzov, 1987
P. curvitibia Stackelberg, 1960
P. divicoi (Goeldlin, 1974)
P. elegantissima Lucas, 1976
P. fumida (Goeldlin, 1974)
P. kuznetzovi Steenis & Lucas, 2011
P. lyneborgi Torp Pedersen, 1971
P. maculipennis (Meigen, 1822)
P. mesasiatica Stackelberg, 1952
P. mongolorum Stackelberg, 1952
P. nataliae Kuznetzov, 1987
P. nigriana (Séguy, 1961)
P. obscura Steenis & Lucas, 2011
P. ochreobasalis Steenis & Lucas, 2011
P. orientalis Steenis & Lucas, 2011
P. pennina (Goeldlin, 1974)
P. sibirica Violovitsh, 1981
P. siciliana Nielsen & Torp, 1973
P. speighti Verlinden, 1999
P. thapsiana Kassebeer, 1995
P. vandergooti Steenis & Lucas, 2011
P. varipes Meigen, 1822
P. viduata (Linnaeus, 1758)
P. virens (Fabricius, 1805)
P. zeneggenensis (Goeldlin, 1974)
P. zloti Vujic, 1997

References

Diptera of Europe
Hoverfly genera
Pipizinae
Taxa named by Camillo Rondani